The Akademische Orchestervereinigung Göttingen (AOV, Academic orchestral society) is a symphony orchestra in Göttingen, Germany. It was founded in 1906 by academics of the University of Göttingen.

Starting in 1950, Hermann Fuchs was the AOV's musical director for 37 years. Thomas-Michael Gribow was its conductor from 1991 to 2003; Lorenz Nordmeyer was appointed for this position in 2004.

The orchestra gained national recognition when it was instrumental in  Oskar Hagen's initiative of rediscovering the operas of George Frideric Handel after World War I; this eventually lead to the Göttingen International Handel Festival. During that festival in 1935, the orchestra performed the first modern-day production of Handel's Partenope conducted by Fritz Lehmann. Two years earlier, it recorded Kurt Weill's Der Flug der Lindberghs under Hermann Fuchs. In 2000, it performed the world premiere of the "Overture to The Bad Room" by American composer Justin Laird Weaver.

The members of the orchestra form three chamber groups: the AOV Brass Quintet, the Foehrenberg-Quartett, and the Maggiore Quartett.

Literature
75 Jahre Akademische Orchestervereinigung Göttingen: 1906–1981, Board of Akademische Orchestervereinigung Göttingen, 1981

References

External links
Home page

German symphony orchestras
1906 establishments in Germany
Musical groups established in 1906
University of Göttingen